The Balinese language has an elaborate decimal numeral system.

Basic numerals

The numerals 1–10 have basic, combining, and independent forms, many of which are formed through reduplication. The combining forms are used to form higher numbers. In some cases there is more than one word for a numeral, reflecting the Balinese register system; halus (high-register) forms are listed in italics.

Final orthographic -a is a schwa [ə]. 

* A less productive combining form of a- 1 is sa-, as can be seen in many of the numbers below. It, ulung-, and sangang- are from Javanese. Tiga 3 is from Sanskrit trika.  Dasa 10 is from Sanskrit daśa.

Teens, tweens, and tens
Like English, Balinese has compound forms for the teens and tens; however, it also has a series of compound 'tweens', 21–29. The teens are based on a root *-welas, the tweens on -likur, and the tens are formed by the combining forms above. Hyphens are not used in the orthography, but have been added to the table below to clarify their derivation. 

The high-register combining forms kalih- 2 and tigang- 3 are used with -likur, -dasa, and higher numerals (below), but not for the teens.

The teens are from Javanese, where the -olas forms are regular, apart from pele-kutus 18, which is suppletive. Sa-laé 25 (one thread [of 25 Chinese coins]), and se-ket 50 (one tie [of two threads of coins]) are also suppletive, and cognate with Javanese səlawé 25 and səkət 50. 

There are additional numerals pasasur ~ sasur 35 and se-timahan ~ se-timan 45 (one opium packet [costing 45 coins]), and a compound telung-benang (three threads [of coins]) for 75.

Higher numbers

The unit combining forms are combined with atus 100, atak 200, amas 400, tali 1000, laksa 10,000, keti 100,000, and yuta 1,000,000 as they do with dasa 10:

Atak is a 'bundle' (of 200 coins) and amas is 'gold' (a gold coin being worth 400 copper coins). In addition, there is karobelah 150, lebak 175, and sepa (one pa?) for 1600. At least karobelah has a cognate in Javanese, ro-bəlah, where ro- is the short form for two (as in rolas 12).

See also
 Balinese script
 Javanese numerals

Further reading
 Angka utawi wilangan Bali (Balinese numerals or numbers)
 Paplajahan Bahasa Bali: Angka Wilangan Bali Lengkap

Balinese language
Numerals